Vashon is a census-designated place (CDP) in King County, Washington, United States. It covers an island alternately called Vashon Island or Vashon–Maury Island, the largest island in Puget Sound south of Admiralty Inlet.

The island is connected to West Seattle and the Kitsap Peninsula to the north and Tacoma to the south via the Washington State Ferries system, as well as to Downtown Seattle via the King County Water Taxi. The island has resisted the construction of a fixed bridge to preserve its relative isolation and rural character. Vashon Island is also known for its annual strawberry festival, former sheepdog trials, and agriculture.

History
Vashon Island sits in the midpoint of southern Puget Sound, between Seattle and Tacoma, Washington. The Cascadia Subduction Zone last saw a major rupture in 1700, but the potential of the zone could cause one of the worst natural disasters in the history of North America.

Native American inhabitants 
Up until the late 1700s, Vashon and Maury Islands were inhabited solely by American Indians, and there is evidence of human activity on Vashon Island dating back 10,000 to 12,000 years. Historical data from the era when the first Native Americans settled Vashon–Maury Island is limited. Some of the Native peoples known to have lived on Vashon Island were the Marpole culture from about 7,000 years ago, the Salish about 1,000 years ago, and the Sqababsh (known in Chinook Wawa as the S'Homamish) starting about 500 years ago, the latter of which established 5 known major village sites. The Tulalip Indians is another tribe that populated the villages along the shores of both islands. Fishing was abundant in the cold saltwater of the central Puget Sound basin, helping Native American tribes to thrive. Moreover, the many waterways and inlets provided easy travel by way of canoe.

Euramerican settlement
The first non–Native American to explore and the first to chart this island was Captain George Vancouver, during his surveys of the Puget Sound area with the British Royal Navy. The island was named on May 28, 1792, by Vancouver after his friend James Vashon of the Royal Navy. Starting in 1824, different explorer and settler groups stayed on Vashon Island.

Maury Island, immediately to the southeast of Vashon, was named in 1841 by then Lt. Charles Wilkes in honor of William Lewis Maury, an officer in the United States Exploring Expedition. Maury was naturally separated from Vashon by a narrow passage, until local landowners decided to build an earth bridge, or isthmus, linking them together in 1916, thus creating the hamlet of Portage. Therefore, the two-piece isle was renamed Vashon-Maury Island.

The first logging on the island began in 1852. By 1855–1856, the S'Homamish people were interned at Fox Island. European-Americans settled Vashon Island between 1865 and 1890. During that time the main economies on the island were fishing and logging.

In 1890, Japanese Americans started growing strawberries for sale. Denichiro Mukai came to the island in 1910 and became renowned for barreling fresh strawberries using a special method that concentrated flavor and moisture in the fruit and permitted long-distance shipping. In time, Mukai designed and built his own home and elaborate garden and then constructed a sturdy timber framed barreling plant. During the peak years, ice cream, jam and preserve makers across the West were customers of Mukai, relishing the oak barrels for their lingering flavor and mythologizing about the island of strawberry fields. This became an important part of the island economy during the next 50 years, until the Japanese American population was forcibly relocated into internment camps as a response to Japanese/American tension caused by WWII.

In 1892, Vashon College opened in the Burton section of Vashon. During its operation, it was one of the leading colleges in the area. It burned down in 1910.

Geography 

To the west Vashon Island is separated from the Kitsap Peninsula by the Colvos Passage. The Dalco Passage separates Vashon Island from Tacoma to the south. Neighborhoods of Vashon Island include Magnolia Beach, which had a post office from 1908 to 1953, and Raeco, with a post office from 1907 to 1911.

Climate
This region experiences warm (but not hot) and dry summers, with no average monthly temperatures above .  According to the Köppen Climate Classification system, Vashon has a warm-summer Mediterranean climate, abbreviated "Csb" on climate maps.

Demographics 

As of the census of 2000, there were 10,123 people, 4,193 households, and 2,838 families residing in the CDP.  The population density was 273.9 people per square mile (105.7/km2).  There were 4,867 housing units at an average density of 131.7/sq mi (50.8/km2).  The racial makeup of the CDP was 93.61% White, 0.45% Black or African American, 0.70% Native American, 1.56% Asian, 0.06% Pacific Islander, 0.87% from other races, and 2.75% from two or more races.  Hispanic or Latino of any race were 2.56% of the population.

There were 4,193 households, out of which 30.9% had children under the age of 18 living with them, 56.2% were married couples living together, 7.9% had a female householder with no husband present, and 32.3% were non-families. 23.8% of all households were made up of individuals, and 8.0% had someone living alone who was 65 years of age or older. The average household size was 2.40 and the average family size was 2.86.

In the CDP, the population was spread out, with 23.2% under the age of 18, 4.6% from 18 to 24, 25.1% from 25 to 44, 34.0% from 45 to 64, and 13.1% who were 65 years of age or older.  The median age was 44 years.  For every 100 females, there were 94.5 males.  For every 100 females age 18 and over, there were 91.0 males.

The median income for a household in the CDP was $58,261, and the median income for a family was $67,010. Males had a median income of $50,201 versus $36,426 for females. The per capita income for the island was $31,983.  About 4.6% of families and 6.0% of the population were below the poverty line, including 5.2% of those under the age of 18 and 2.2% of those 65 and older.

Based on per capita income, Vashon ranks 32nd of 522 areas in the state of Washington to be ranked.

Government 
In 1994 the Vashon Island Committee for Self-Government circulated a petition calling for the incorporation of Vashon and Maury Islands. At the time only some 448 residents of about 10,000 signed the petition which was then filed with the King County Auditor.

The Vashon-Maury Island Community Council was a body whose purpose was to advise the King County Council on matters relating to Vashon Island and Maury Island. In 2013, it collapsed due to a requirement that it comply with the state's public records act and threats of lawsuits undermined the function of the organization. However, with the adoption of formal bylaws on June 15, 2020, a new Vashon-Maury Island Community Council was officially created by island residents. The new group was formed as a non-profit to help  island residents address important issues facing their community.

Public safety 
Vashon Fire is led by Matt Vinci and is a combination professional-volunteer department. There is one staffed station, Station 55, which houses a minimum staffing of three firefighter/EMTs and two King County paramedics. Station 55 contains four aid units, one engine, one quint, one brush truck, two water tenders, one boat, one ATV, and one support unit. Vashon Fire uses ValleyCom as its dispatch center. There are two outlying stations that contain water tenders and backup engines: Station 56 located in Burton and Station 58 located in Dockton. The department is primarily funded by a property tax levy which last had a voter approved lid lift in 2017.

The island has an established emergency operations center manager who runs emergency drills with members of the community emergency response team (CERT) in order to provide the best response in times of emergencies such as earthquakes. The drills were established as routine through the group VashonBePrepared, a nonprofit, FEMA-sanctioned coalition of disaster preparedness organizations that were previously established on the island. Sometimes the drills have members of the Washington Army National Guard participating and supporting the volunteers.

Crime 
There are some claims that the island is home to various drug houses, a claim which has caused the Vashon Youth & Family Services to offer substance abuse counseling as part of the regular assembly of social services.

Homicide rates on the island are extremely low, with only two homicides reported in the last twenty years and other forms of crime are also largely not seen. In 2005 the Sheriff's Office investigated one rape, six assaults, and forty-nine burglaries, in 2006 they investigated three rapes, eight assaults, and sixty-three burglaries.

Major crimes on the Island include a serial rapist who operated from 2003 through 2010 until he was arrested and charged due to DNA evidence, and a police officer who plead guilty to incest and other sex crimes involving his underage stepdaughter.

Economy 
The economy of Vashon Island is heavily based on residents commuting to Seattle and Tacoma.

Agriculture 
While orchards and strawberry farms formerly played a major role in the Vashon economy, the pressures of suburban residential development have all but eliminated any major commercial agriculture on the island. However, many small farms operate on the island, providing locals with fresh organic produce, milk, and eggs.

Despite the changes, the island continues to observe the tradition of holding a Strawberry Festival every July. In certain areas like Dockton, a significant amount of private property was occupied and subsequently seized from Japanese-American citizens who farmed strawberries on that land until World War II, when they were moved to internment camps away from the island.

Local orchards and wineries are established on the island, with some focusing on developing perry, an alcoholic beverage derived from pear juice instead of grapes. There are at least three wineries that produce 100% locally produced wines and other alcoholic-based beverages.

Manufacturing and industry 
Vashon has lost two of its major industrial employers: K2 Sports moved its manufacturing to China, and the Seattle's Best Coffee roastery operation was closed shortly after SBC was bought by Starbucks. Currently, the largest manufacturer on Vashon is Pacific Research Laboratories, locally referred to as "The Bone Factory".

In 2014 it was reported that the company Edipure was to purchase the old K2 ski plant to manufacture more than 60 marijuana-based snacks including crackers, candy and gummy bears.

Infrastructure

Transportation 
There are no bridges to Vashon Island, so all access to the island is by sea or by air. Most travel on and off the island is on the Washington State Ferry system. A bridge connecting Vashon to Seattle and Kitsap County was planned in 1959, but was ultimately not funded. A second bridge proposal from the Washington State Transportation Commission was withdrawn in 1992 after objections from island residents.

Vashon Municipal Airport is on the northern half of the island. There is no regularly scheduled air service to the airport.

King County Metro provides bus service down the length of the island daily. During peak commute times on weekdays, the buses drive on to the ferry to Seattle. On September 10, 2016, on-island Sunday service returned to Vashon. Route 118 provides islanders with Sunday service for the first time in many years, mirroring Saturday schedules and helping riders connect with both ferry terminals and other destinations in between.

Ferries 
The southern terminus of the Vashon Highway is the Tahlequah Ferry Terminal in the Tahlequah neighborhood, connected to the Point Defiance neighborhood of Tacoma by the Point Defiance–Tahlequah ferry. The northern terminus of the Vashon Highway is the Heights Dock at Point Vashon, serving the state ferry docks at Southworth, and Fauntleroy in West Seattle. Passenger-only service from Heights Dock to Colman Dock in Downtown Seattle is provided by the King County Ferry District, with three sailings in each direction during the morning and afternoon, Monday through Friday.

Health care 
In 2016 it was reported that the medical clinic on the island had closed after CHI Franciscan Health had left the clinic, claiming financial concerns. Another provider, the non-profit Neighborcare Health, pledged to open a new clinic later in the year, alleviating the issue of transporting patients to hospitals off the island via the ferry, which can take upwards of three hours. Neighborcare's lease on the island's clinic expired in 2020, and as of 2021 the clinic was operated by Sea Mar.

During the 2020 COVID-19 pandemic, Vashon faced a shortage of tests, medical resources, and protective equipment. A team of local doctors created their own response plan, dubbed the "Rural Test & Trace Toolkit", with the hopes of creating a model for other isolated communities.

Vaccination concerns 
Many of those who live on the island fail to vaccinate their children due to vaccine hesitancy. It was reported in 2015 that 23.1% of kindergartners in the Vashon Island School District legally opted out of vaccinations against diphtheria and tetanus, whooping cough, measles, mumps, rubella, polio, varicella, and hepatitis B. The number, at the time, was five times the state average. Of those who do not vaccinate, more than 98% cite "Personal" rather than "Religious" or "Medical" as exemptions. Their failure to vaccinate has caused resentment in the community.

Due to expanded access to vaccines, media coverage of the measles outbreaks, and education about the benefits of vaccination, the vaccine rate for the Vashon Island School District has risen over the years, even though it is still one of the lowest in the United States. The district's rates of fully immunized students rose 31% over six years, from 56% to 74% as of the 2017–2018 school year; although still below the 95% target rate for the rest of the country. In 2019, it was reported that some 11.6% of families on the island had failed to vaccinate their children.

Education
Public schools:
There are three public schools provided by the Vashon Island School District
 Chautauqua Elementary School
 McMurray Middle School
 Vashon Island High School

Private schools:
There are two private schools in Vashon.
 The Harbor School (grades 4 to 8). 65 students were enrolled as of September 2013.
 Carpe Diem Primary School (Kindergarten to 3rd grade). 26 students were enrolled as of September 2013.

Arts and culture 
The annual studio tour was created in the late 1970s by some of the potters who lived on the island. The group was rebranded in February 2018 as the Vashon Island Visual Artists, and they applied for non-profit status in 2015. The group now operates semi-annual tours of studios of local artists, classes, workshops, salons, exhibits, and social activities for artists, with membership around 300. The island is home to a choral group established in 1989 under the name Island Singers, and now known as the Vashon Island Chorale. 

On the first Friday of every month, there is a gallery walk where the art galleries in town open for visitors. The Vashon Center for the Arts along with cafés are also open during the First Friday gallery walk which have shown the work of local artists including Ann Leda Shapiro.

Media

Broadcast radio stations 

In 2014, a small media outlet, the Voice of Vashon, acquired a low-power FM radio broadcast license from the FCC. KVSH-FM went live on 101.9 FM in October 2014, and is also still available for live streaming. The Voice of Vashon started filing as a non-profit starting from the 2015 tax year. The Voice of Vashon records and broadcasts community arts events with support from King County 4Culture grants. The Voice of Vashon's board includes director and producer Rick Wallace. The Voice of Vashon also operates a television station, Comcast Channel 21, and its emergency broadcast system at 1650AM. Each of these outlets serves Vashon and Maury Islands year round, 24 hours/day, 7 days/week, with island-generated or specific information, entertainment and emergency alerts. 

Maury Island is home to numerous AM transmitters. KIRO 710 (built in 1941) has two massive towers for its 50,000-watt day/night transmitter. KTTH 770, which transmits 50,000 watts during the day and 5,000 watts at night, shares towers with KPTR. KIRO and KTTH are owned by Bonneville International.

There was a tower originally built in 1946 for KEVR 1090AM, which later became KING radio, and is now KPTR, owned by iHeartMedia. It transmits 50,000 watts day/night and operates three towers. This site is shared with KTTH.

On Vashon Island, radio station KVI 570 has a single tower on a beach in Tramp Harbor, nicknamed "KVI Beach". KVI transmits 24 hours a day at 5,000 watts. KNWN 1000 transmits 50,000 watts day/night and has a three-tower setup on the northeast corner of the island. Both KVI and KNWN are owned by Lotus Communications.

KGNW AM 820 propagates its signal from three towers in the center of the island. It operates 50,000 watts during the day and 5,000 at night. It is owned by Salem Media Group. KJR 950 shares the towers at the KGNW site, transmits 50,000 watts day/night, and is owned by iHeartMedia.

These stations have located their transmitters on Vashon and Maury Islands because local soil conductivity, important for signal propagation in the megawatt broadcast frequency range, is greater than elsewhere in the Puget Sound area. The surrounding sea water is also helpful for radio propagation.

Sports and recreation 
The island is home to the Vashon Island Rowing Club and Burton Beach Rowing Club, both of which participate in many events such as the Opening Day celebrations on Seattle's Montlake Cut.

The Vashon Sheepdog Classic occurs each year at the Misty Isle Farms, with local food and merchandise vendors, with all profits going to area nonprofits. The trials are completed by a team composed of a dog and its handler who are released into a shedding ring and work to herd the sheep into specific areas. The island is also home to the Vashon Island Golf & Country Club.

Notable people
 Matt Alber, musician
 Ian Moore, American guitarist and singer-songwriter
 Gene Amondson, Prohibition Party presidential candidate
 Gene "Bean" Baxter, co-host of KROQ's Kevin and Bean radio morning show
 Steve Berlin, of the Grammy Award-winning band Los Lobos
 Alex Borstein, actress noted especially for her work on Fox's MADtv and as the voice of Family Guy'''s Lois Griffin
 Berkeley Breathed, author of the political satire comic strip Bloom County, resided on Vashon for some time. He wrote a children's book based on a bicycle in a tree. The real-life tree, growing around a bicycle, can be seen on the island.
 Michael Chabon, writer and 2001 Pulitzer winner. His novel Summerland (2002) is set on fictional Clam Island, WA, which Chabon has acknowledged having modeled on Vashon.  Some of the stories in his collection Werewolves In Their Youth (1999) are also set on an island that strongly resembles Vashon.
 Donald Cole, abstract expressionist painter
 Heather Corinna, feminist sex educator
 Karen Cushman, young adult fiction author
 Pete Droge, musician
 Booth Gardner, former Washington state governor
 Mary Matsuda Gruenewald, memoirist
 Art Hansen, painter and lithographer
 Rob Hotchkiss, founding member of Train
 Eyvind Kang, modern composer
 Michael Leavitt (artist), sculptor
 Betty MacDonald, author who specialized in humorous autobiographical tales; lived on Vashon and used the island as the setting of her book Onions in the Stew Zach Mann, reality TV star from MTV's The Real World Robert Miskimon, author
 Susan Nattrass, a former world champion shooter from Canada
 Kaitlin Olson, actor best known for playing Deandra Reynolds in FX hit comedy It's Always Sunny in Philadelphia and playing Micky Molng in The Mick; lived here until the age of 8
 Frank Peretti, Christian fiction writer, grew up on Vashon Island
 Basil Poledouris, film composer, spent the last four years of his life on Vashon Island
 Austin Post, aerial photographer and glaciologist
 John Ratzenberger, who played Clifford C. Clavin, Jr. on the television show Cheers, and also played varying roles in many Pixar films, once lived on and still owns land on connected Maury Island. He also helped to start a school on the island.
 Peter Rinearson, Pulitzer Prize winner and entrepreneur
 Dan Savage, editor of The Stranger and the author of "Savage Love," a syndicated sex advice column, formerly lived on Vashon Island with his partner and adopted son. By his own account, he moved from Vashon because he was unsure that the local public schools would welcome the adopted son of gay partners.
 Josh Tillman, singer-songwriter, drummer with the Fleet Foxes, also performs as Father John Misty
 Aaron Turner, Hydra Head Records and SIGE Records owner, musician
 Edith Derby Williams, historian, granddaughter of former President Theodore Roosevelt, lived on Vashon Island from 1949 until her death in 2008
 Benjamin F. Wilson, recipient of the Medal of Honor for his actions in the Korean War

 Points of interest 

Historic Landmarks
Vashon Island has a number of buildings and sites that are listed on the King County Historic Register:

Other Points of Interest

 The bike in the tree. A bicycle placed in the fork of a tree, allegedly when a child chained a bike to the tree decades ago and never picked it up, and the tree subsequently grew around it. This is a common local and tourist attraction, and has been subject to vandalism in recent years. The bike in the tree served as the inspiration for the Christmas book Red Ranger Came Calling'' by Berkeley Breathed.
 Vashon Farmer's Market
 Sea Breeze Farm, one of several small independent farms on Vashon.
 Seattle Distilling Company, a microdistillery and Vashon's first legal distillery
 Vashon Island Coffee Roasterie. Located in the heart of what was formerly the island's town center, this coffee shop is in a building almost 100 years old, and is one of the earliest locations of Seattle's Best Coffee.
 Point Robinson Lighthouse. Point Robinson Beach on the east shore of Maury Island has been the site of a lighthouse since 1885. The current Point Robinson lighthouse has been fully automated since 1978.
 Fisher Pond, a 90-acre terrestrial and freshwater conservancy, the largest on Vashon Island
 Jesus Barn Farm, a farmstead founded in 1893. During the 1960s it was turned into an agrarian lifestyle commune. Local lore suggests this is when the iconic "Jesus" was first painted on the side of the barn.
 Andrew Will Winery, established 1989
 Misty Isle Farms,  farm that produces Misty Isle Angus Beef
 All-Merciful Saviour Monastery, a Russian Orthodox monastery on Maury Island
 Glen Acres, Washington, a community on Vashon Island

References

External links 

 Vashon-Maury Map
 VashonHistory.com
 ExploreVashon.com

 
Census-designated places in King County, Washington
Islands of Washington (state)
Islands of King County, Washington
Islands of Puget Sound
Populated places on Puget Sound